Collingham and Linton Cricket Club is a cricket ground in Collingham, West Yorkshire.  The first recorded match on the ground was in 1896.

In 1986 the club hosted the first Women's Test between England women and India women.  The following year the ground hosted its second and final Women's Test between England women and Australia women.  In 1993, the ground held a Women's One Day International between England women and Australia women in the 1993 Women's Cricket World Cup.

In local domestic cricket, the ground is the home venue of Collingham and Linton Cricket Club.

References

External links
Collingham and Linton Cricket Club on CricketArchive
Collingham and Linton Cricket Club on Cricinfo

Cricket grounds in West Yorkshire
English club cricket teams
Cricket in Yorkshire
1986 establishments in England